Waverley was an electoral district of the Legislative Assembly in the Australian state of New South Wales, originally created in 1894, with the abolition of multi-member constituencies, out of part of Paddington, and named after and including the Sydney suburb of Waverley. In 1904 Waverley lost part of the seat to Randwick and was expanded to include parts of Woollahra and Randwick. In 1920, with the introduction of proportional representation, it was absorbed into Eastern Suburbs. Waverley was recreated in 1927. In 1959 parts of Waverly and Paddington were combined to form Paddington-Waverley, which was abolished in 1962 and replaced by Bligh. In 1971, Bondi and Randwick were abolished and partly replaced by a recreated Waverley. At the 1990 redistribution, Waverley was abolished again and absorbed into Coogee and Vaucluse.

Members for Waverley

Election results

References

Former electoral districts of New South Wales
Constituencies established in 1894
1894 establishments in Australia
Constituencies disestablished in 1920
1920 disestablishments in Australia
Constituencies established in 1927
1927 establishments in Australia
Constituencies disestablished in 1959
1959 disestablishments in Australia
Constituencies established in 1971
1971 establishments in Australia
Constituencies disestablished in 1991
1991 disestablishments in Australia